Rich Jones may refer to:
Rich Jones (musician) (born 1973), English guitarist
Rich Jones (basketball) (born 1946), retired American basketball player

See also
Ritchie Jones (born 1986), footballer
Richard Jones (disambiguation)